James Frank Gilliam (14 March 1915 in Seattle – 16 March 1990 in Princeton, New Jersey) was an American classical scholar and historian of ancient Rome.

Career
James Frank Gilliam studied at San Jose State University (B.A. 1935) and at Stanford University (M.A. 1936). In 1940 he earned his Ph.D. at Yale University under the classicist Michael Rostovtzeff. After his Ph.D., he worked as an instructor in classics until his academic career was interrupted by military service in World War II from 1941 to 1945.

In 1947 Gilliam joined the faculty of Wells College in Aurora, New York as an assistant professor. In 1949 he moved to the University of Iowa, where he became a professor of history and classics, remaining until 1961. After a year as a professor of history at the University of Oregon (1961–1962), Gilliam became a professor of Greek and Latin at Columbia University. His final academic appointment was at the Institute for Advanced Study (IAS) in Princeton, New Jersey, wherein 1965 he became a professor of classics and history in the School of Historical Studies. He retired from the IAS as professor emeritus in 1985. Already in the academic years 1958/1959 and 1963/1964 he had been a visiting member of the IAS. In the academic year 1955/1956, he was a Guggenheim Fellow. He was also a Marshall Scholar.

From 1970 to 1985, Gilliam worked part-time at Columbia University: from 1970 to 1981 as curator of the papyri collection and from 1970 to 1985 as an adjunct professor. From 1972 to 1975 he was a visiting lecturer at Princeton University. In the academic year 1978/1979 he taught as Sather Professor at the University of California, Berkeley.

Achievements
As Rostovtzeff's student, Gilliam focused his research on papyrology and on Roman military history. Based on the finding from Dura Europos, where Rostovtzeff had excavated in the 1920s and 1930s, Gilliam studied inscriptions and papyrological documents of Roman military history in the eastern provinces. His numerous research papers dealt with almost all aspects of the complexities of Roman military history. His mastery of the material enabled him to plan an exhaustive presentation of ancient Roman military history in monograph form. He repeatedly promised to produce such a presentation but died without fulfilling his plan.

Sources

External links
 
 Gilliam, J. F. — WorldCat Identities
 photo: James Gilliam – standing :: School of Historical Studies, IAS

American classical scholars
Classical scholars of Columbia University
Classical scholars of the Institute for Advanced Study
Institute for Advanced Study faculty
American papyrologists
San Jose State University alumni
Stanford University alumni
University of Iowa faculty
Yale University alumni
1915 births
1990 deaths
Historians of ancient Rome
20th-century American historians